Seasons of Giving (also known as Winnie the Pooh: Seasons of Giving) is a 1999 American direct-to-video animated musical film which included A Winnie the Pooh Thanksgiving, and two episodes from The New Adventures of Winnie the Pooh (Groundpiglet Day and Find Her, Keep Her). It features new songs by The Sherman Brothers, and the final time that Paul Winchell voiced Tigger.

Plot

Groundpiglet Day

Tigger wants to ski, but Winnie the Pooh and Piglet point out that there's no snow. So, they go ask Rabbit what day of the year it is, but after opening his front door and letting the wind blow in, Rabbit's calendar pages (November to February) get torn off and get swept under Rabbit's bed, but he doesn't realize it, and claims that it's February 2, Groundhog Day. In an effort to find out if there are two more weeks of winter or if spring comes tomorrow, they ask Gopher if he sees his shadow. Gopher angrily points out he's a gopher not a groundhog, so they have Piglet pretend to be a groundhog. His hat falls over his eyes, preventing him from seeing. Thinking that winter is over, they all prepare for spring by airing out their houses, planting gardens and spring cleaning. Later that day, it snows. A discouraged Rabbit confronts Piglet for lying to them and tells him that it's all his fault, and goes home to see wind blowing into his house and the calendar pages being blown outside. After putting the lost pages back on the calendar, he realizes that it's not Groundhog Day, it's only November 13. Feeling awful for what he said, Rabbit goes to apologize to Piglet, only to find a note from Piglet saying that he's gone to look for a real groundhog. Rabbit frantically goes looking for Piglet, while Piglet looks for a groundhog. Rabbit tells everyone that it's November 13. So, they decide to get ready for Thanksgiving.

A Winnie the Pooh Thanksgiving

Later, it is Thanksgiving in the Hundred Acre Wood and Winnie the Pooh and his friends bring food for the big dinner. Then, things change when Rabbit informs them that Thanksgiving is a special time of year that should include special items, so Pooh and the gang set off to find those very items.

Find Her, Keep Her

A month later, on Christmas Eve, Rabbit tells the story of how he met a baby bluebird named Kessie. Later that summer, Owl teaches her to fly. Rabbit refuses to let her fly, and with that, they go home. In the fall, Kessie looks out the window to see wild ducks flying south for the winter. For days, she tries to fly.  Pooh, Tigger, and Piglet have an idea on how to get Kessie South for the winter, a giant slingshot. When Kessie is about to take off, Rabbit arrives and stops her. He yells at Pooh. Next he tells Tigger to stay out of slingshot and let go of it. Tigger lets go, and Rabbit is hit and falls off the same cliff Kessie had fallen off of that summer. Kessie quickly swoops down, and grabs Rabbit, and brings him back to the top. Now that Kessie can fly, she plans on going south the next day. The next morning, Owl, Pooh, Piglet, and Tigger say goodbye to Kessie as she prepares to fly south. Meanwhile, Rabbit is in his garden feeling sad, and stubs his toe on a potted carrot, that Kessie had planted. He rushes to say goodbye to Kessie but finds he's too late now and Kessie is gone. However, he is happy when Kessie comes back to say goodbye. Back in the present, Rabbit tells Roo that he has not seen Kessie since then. Everyone hurries outside to decorate a tree. Christopher Robin arrives to help decorate. After the tree is done, Rabbit realizes he forgot the most important part, a star to go on top of the tree. Rabbit is really sad but then sees a falling star. Everyone gathers to make a wish, only to realize that it's not a falling star. It is Kessie holding a star, which she puts on the tree. Rabbit and Kessie hug, and Kessie wishes Rabbit a Merry Christmas.

Cast
 Jim Cummings as Winnie the Pooh and Tigger 
Paul Winchell as Tigger (archive footage)
 Steve Schatzberg as Piglet
 John Fiedler as Piglet (archive footage)
 Ken Sansom as Rabbit
 Brady Bluhm as Christopher Robin
 Frankie J. Galasso as Christopher Robin's singing voice
 Gregg Berger as Eeyore
 Peter Cullen as Eeyore (archive footage)
 Amber Hood as Kessie
 Laura Mooney as Kessie (archive footage)
 Nikita Hopkins as Roo
 Tress MacNeille as Kanga
 Andre Stojka as Owl
 Michael Gough as Gopher
 Laurie Main as The Narrator
 Tim Hoskins as Christopher Robin (archive footage)

Songs

Release

Seasons of Giving was originally released on VHS on November 9, 1999. It was released on DVD on November 4, 2003.

It was reissued again as a 10th anniversary gift set edition on DVD on September 29, 2009 the same day as Muppet Christmas: Letters to Santa DVD. This release included a collectible stocking gift pack.

See also
 List of Christmas films

References

External links
 
 
 

1999 animated films
1999 films
1999 direct-to-video films
1990s American animated films
1990s Christmas films
1990s musical comedy-drama films
1990s fantasy comedy films
1990s musical fantasy films
American children's animated fantasy films
American films with live action and animation
American children's animated musical films
Animated anthology films
Animated Christmas films
American Christmas films
American fantasy comedy films
American musical comedy-drama films
American musical fantasy films
Children's comedy-drama films
Winnie-the-Pooh films
Direct-to-video fantasy films
Disney direct-to-video animated films
Winnie the Pooh (franchise)
Disney Television Animation films
1999 comedy-drama films
1990s children's animated films
Films directed by Jun Falkenstein
1990s English-language films